Moody Arthur Awori (born 5 December 1928), known as "Uncle Moody", is a former Kenyan politician who served as the ninth Vice President of Kenya from 25 September 2003 to 9 January 2008. He is also the author of Riding on a Tiger, an autobiography about his life in politics.

Personal life
Moody Arthur Awori was born in Butere the capital of the former Butere/Mumias District to Canon Jeremiah Awori and Mariamu Awori. He was one of their 16 children, a good number of whom went on to hold different senior positions in politics, medicine, and other sectors.

Awori's eldest brother, Musa, died of a snake bite at infancy. His older brother, W.W.W. Awori, served on the Legislative Council in the 1950s. His younger brother Aggrey Awori is a politician in Uganda who came third in the presidential elections of 2001. His sister, Mary Okelo, is a founder and CEO of the Makini Schools.

His brother, Professor Nelson Wanyama Awori, led the team that carried out black Africa's first successful kidney transplant which was performed at Nairobi Hospital in 1978. Another brother, Hannington Ochwada Awori, was one of the pioneer civil engineers in Kenya.

Moody Awori attended Mang'u High School, and later joined Kakamega School. Subsequently, he studied at Makerere University in Uganda. He is a devout Roman Catholic.

Politics
Moody Awori was first elected as a Member of Parliament representing Funyula Constituency in Busia District in Western Province in 1984. Under President Daniel arap Moi, he served in several positions as assistant minister.

Awori broke with the ruling party, KANU, in 2002 and joined the National Rainbow Coalition opposition party, and served as chairman of NARC’S top decision making organ. When Moi was succeeded by Mwai Kibaki, Awori was made Minister of Home Affairs in January 2003 and then Vice-President (while remaining in charge of Home Affairs) in September 2003, following the death of the previous Vice-President, Michael Kijana Wamalwa, in London.

In the December 2007 parliamentary election he lost his parliamentary seat. On 8 January 2008, Kibaki named Kalonzo Musyoka to replace Awori as Vice-President and Minister of Home Affairs, and Awori handed over the office on 9 January. Awori, describing Musyoka as "a friend and political son", said that he believed Musyoka was "equal to the task", while Musyoka said that he had "deep respect" for Awori, who he called "a true gentleman".

Anglo Leasing Scandal
He has recently been implicated in the Anglo Leasing scandal in a report published on 22 January 2006 by John Githongo. He has insisted upon his innocence and refused to resign, saying he saw no reason to. In February 2006 eighty Members of Parliament demanded his resignation, threatening street protests if their requests were not met. A few days later protestors on the streets of Nairobi called for his resignation as part of a wider anti-corruption demonstration. After this was not achieved, the Social Reform Centre said that he was undermining the integrity of his office in refusing to step down and promised to continue protesting. In a 22 February interview with the Public Accounts Committee Awori blamed civil servants, claiming to have been misled and that he had had nothing to do with any wrongdoing.
.

Awards

Moody Awori the founder chairman of the Association for the Physically Disabled of Kenya, and a member of the Chartered Institute of Secretaries.

He holds an honorary doctor of laws degree from the Southern New Hampshire University in the United States of America. He was awarded the degree in May 2004 in recognition of his many years of dedicated service to the disadvantaged in society, particularly the disabled and the poor.
tute of Secretaries.

In recognition of his outstanding contribution to the nation and the society in general, the Kenyan Government decorated him with two high level State awards – Elder of the Burning Spear (EBS) and Elder of the Golden Heart (EGH).

On the eve of his 91st birthday, President Uhuru Kenyatta appointed him the chair of the Sports Funds Board, saying that young people have for far too long been appointed to those positions but failed to stop theft of public funds, so it was time to try an older Kenyan. The President asked Kenyans who thought Uncle Moody was too old for the task to leave him alone.

References

External links 
A Kenyan newspaper article on the Awori's role in the Anglo Leasing scandal
BBC News: Article on Awori's involvement in the scandal
Southern New Hampshire University Catalog 2012-2013

1928 births
Living people
Vice-presidents of Kenya
Kenyan Roman Catholics
Makerere University alumni
Converts to Roman Catholicism from Anglicanism
Kenya African National Union politicians
National Rainbow Coalition politicians
Members of the National Assembly (Kenya)
Government ministers of Kenya
Alumni of Mang'u High School
Alumni of Kakamega School
Elders of the Order of the Burning Spear
People from Butere